WZYN (810 AM) is a Christian radio station broadcasting a Southern gospel format. Licensed to Hahira, Georgia, United States, the station serves the Valdosta, Georgia area.  The station is currently owned by Bemiss Road Baptist Church and Lowndes Cty Christian Academy.

History
The station went on the air as WAWB on 1986-01-23. On 1989-03-14, the station changed its call sign to WXLR, on 1993-03-01 to WSHF, on 1995-07-14 to WWRQ, on 1995-12-08 to WTHV, and on 2014-12-24 to the current WZYN

Previous logo

References

External links

ZYN
ZYN
Southern Gospel radio stations in the United States